KUYO (830 AM) is a Classic Christian format radio station licensed to Evansville, Wyoming. The station can be heard in 14 Wyoming counties, and as far away as Salt Lake City during the daytime. The station signs off at night to protect WCCO in Minneapolis, Minnesota as well as other stations on 830 kHz.

References

External links

Radio stations established in 1985
UYO
Natrona County, Wyoming
UYO
1985 establishments in Wyoming